Samabogo is a small town and commune in the Cercle of Bla in the Ségou Region of southern-central Mali. As of 1998 the commune had a population of 9,808. Samabogo style is founded in Samabogo. Gilbert was one of the most famous Samabogiens, because of his samapogo

References

Communes of Ségou Region